Bislama (also known by its earlier French name) is an English-based creole language and one of the official languages of Vanuatu. It is the first language of many of the "Urban ni-Vanuatu" (citizens who live in Port Vila and Luganville) and the second language of much of the rest of the country's residents. The lyrics of "Yumi, Yumi, Yumi", the country's national anthem, are composed in Bislama.

More than 95% of Bislama words are of English origin, whilst the remainder comprises a few dozen words from French as well as some specific vocabulary inherited from various languages of Vanuatu; though these are essentially limited to flora and fauna terminology. While the influence of these vernacular languages is low on the vocabulary side, it is very high in the morphosyntax. As such, Bislama can be described simply as a language with an English vocabulary and an Oceanic grammar and phonology.

History
During the period of "blackbirding" in the 1870s and 1880s, hundreds of thousands of Pacific islanders (many of them from the New Hebrides – now the Vanuatu archipelago) were taken as indentured labourers, often kidnapped, and forced to work on plantations, mainly in Queensland, Australia, and Fiji. With several languages being spoken in these plantations a localised pidgin was formed, combining English vocabulary with grammatical structures typical of languages in the region. This early plantation pidgin is the origin not only of Bislama, but also of Tok Pisin in Papua New Guinea, and Pijin of the Solomon Islands; though not of Torres Strait Creole in the north of Australia.

This creole started spreading throughout the Vanuatu archipelago at the turn of the 20th century, as former blackbirds and their descendants began to return to their native islands. Knowledge of this creole would facilitate communication not only with European traders and settlers, but also between native populations, and because Vanuatu is the most language-dense country in the world (one count puts it at 113 languages for a population of 225,000), Bislama usefully serves as a lingua franca for communication between ni-Vanuatu, as well as with and between foreigners. Although it has been primarily a spoken-only language for most of its history, the first dictionary of Bislama was published in 1995. This, along with its second edition in 2004, has helped to create a standardised and uniform spelling of written Bislama.

Besides Bislama, most ni-Vanuatu also know their local language, the local language of their father and/or mother, as well as their spouse, oftentimes. The country's official languages of tuition in schools and educational institutions are English and French.

Name
The name of Bislama (also referred to, especially in French, as "Bichelamar") comes via the early 19th century word "Beach-la-Mar" from pseudo-French "biche de mer" or "bêche de mer", sea cucumber, which itself comes from an alteration of the Portuguese "bicho do mar". In the early 1840s, sea cucumbers were also harvested and dried at the same time that sandalwood was gathered. The names biche-la-mar and 'Sandalwood English' came to be associated with the kind of pidgin that came to be used by the local laborers between themselves, as well as their English-speaking overseers.

Robert Louis Stevenson wrote in an account of his travels through the Pacific in 1888 and 1889, "the natives themselves have often scraped up a little English ... or an efficient pidgin, what is called to the westward 'Beach-la-Mar'." In Jack London's story "Yah! Yah! Yah!", one of his "South Sea Tales", there is repeated a reference to "a bastard lingo called bech-de-mer", and much of the story's dialogue is conducted in it.

Today, the word "bislama" itself is seldom used by younger speakers of Bislama to refer to sea slugs, as a new re-borrowing from pseudo-French "bêche de mer", which has taken the form "besdemea", has become more popular.

Orthography

The Bislama Latin alphabet uses the letters A, B, D, E, F, G, H, I, J, K, L, M, N, O, P, R, S, T, U, V, W, Y and the digraphs AE, AO and NG.

An older Latin orthography, used before 1995, had  É (now written E), AI and AU (now AE and AO). For those vowels in hiatus, AÏ and AÜ were used (now written AI and AU).

On the island of Pentecost, the avoiuli script is sometimes used for Bislama. The shapes of the letters derive from sand-drawing. It has distinct letters for NG and NGG, but otherwise corresponds closely to the Latin alphabet above, though capitals are seldom used, punctuation differs, there are digits for higher numbers and logograms for commonly traded commodities such as pig tusks.

Grammar
Two frequent words in Bislama are "long" and "blong", which take the place of many prepositions in English or French.

"Long"
Long as 'next to', 'by', 'beside' etc.
Stoa long haos The store next to the house.
long as 'at' or 'to'
Mi bin stap long ples ia bifo I have been to this place before.
Mi stap long stoa I am at the store.
long as 'in'
Jea long haos The chair in the house.

Long holds many other related meanings, and is sometimes used in improvisation.

"Blong"
Originally from the English word "belong", blong takes the place of 'of' or the genitive case in other languages. Just like of in English, it is one of the most widely used and versatile words in the language, and can indicate possession, country of origin, defining characteristics, intention, and others.

Buk blong mi The book that belongs to me, my book
Man blong Amerika Man from America, American.
Hemi woman blong saiens She is a woman of science, She is a scientist.
Man blong dring Man of drinking i.e. a drinker

Verbs
Verbs in Bislama usually consist of a stem word (borrowed from English, French or indigenous languages); most transitive verbs add to this a transitive suffix.

The form of that suffix is /-em/, /-im/, or /-um/, depending on vowel harmony. If the last vowel of the verb's stem is either -u- or -i-, then that vowel will normally be copied into the transitive suffix – however, there are rare exceptions. For all other stem vowels, the transitive suffix has its default form /-em/:

Note that exceptions exist, such as lukim ("look").

Examples of transitive verbs which exceptionally don't take this suffix include: kakae 'eat, bite'; trink 'drink'; save 'know'; se 'say'.

Verbs do not conjugate. The tense, aspect and mood of a sentence are indicated with markers such as stap, bin and bae that are placed in the sentence.

Mi stap kakae taro I'm eating taro
Mi bin kakae taro I have eaten taro
Bae mi kakae taro I will eat taro

Nouns
The plural is formed by putting ol before the word. For example, bia 'beer'; ol bia = "beers". Ol comes from the English "all". When used with numbers, the singular form is used. 2 bia, 3 bia, etc.

Pronouns

The personal pronouns of Bislama closely resemble those of Tok Pisin. They feature four grammatical numbers (singular, dual, trial and plural) and also encode the clusivity distinction: 1st person non-singular pronouns (equivalent of English we) are described as inclusive if they include the addressee (i.e. {you + I}, {you + I + others}), but exclusive otherwise (i.e. {I + other people}). Bislama pronouns do not decline.

The third person singular hem, also written em lacks gender distinction, so it can mean either he, she or it. The predicate marker i – a particle which is placed before the verbal phrase of a sentence – is sometimes merged with the third person pronoun, giving the words hemi and emi, respectively, in singular, and oli in plural.

Tense/aspect/mood markers
stap + V : (progressive) ongoing or habitual action
hem i stap kukum kumala or:
hemi stap kukum kumala he/she is cooking sweet potatoes
bin + V : past tense  (with implication that the state is no longer true)
hem i bin sik long fiva she was sick with fever [but is no longer sick]
V + finis : (perfective) "already" (when placed at the end of a phrase; elsewhere it means "finish")
hem i kakae finis she has already eaten
bae + V (occasionally bambae): (irrealis) future or hypothetical actions (though, like in English, generally not used in conditional sentences)
bae mi go long Santo I will go to Santo
 If the plane hadn't been full, I would have gone to Santo
no + V : negative, "not"
hem i no wantem yam he doesn't want yam
nomo + V: "no longer" (when placed after the predicate; elsewhere it means "only")
hem i nomo kakae yam he no longer eats yam
hem i kakae yam nomo he only eats yam
neva + V : never
hem i neva kakae yam he's never eaten yam
jes + V : (<"just") an action that has recently occurred
 we just woke up
In a future context, jes entails a delay, rendered in English as "eventually":
bae mi pem I will buy it / Let me buy it
bae mi jes pem, be noyet I will buy it (eventually), but not yet
V + gogo : continued action
hem i kukum kumala gogo he keeps on cooking sweet potatoes
mas + V : "must", be obliged to
hem i mas kakae he must eat
traem + V : "try to"; also sometimes used for politeness in requests
hem i stap traem katem he's trying to cut it
traem soem long mi could you show it me? (request)
wantem + V :  "want to"
hem i wantem go long Santo she wants to go to Santo
save + V : be able to, or be in the habit of doing
mi save rid I can read
mi no save dring suga I don't take sugar in drinks
fish ia i save kilim man this fish can kill a person

Some of these markers also have lexical meanings. For example, save can mean "be able to" but it is also a verb "know".

Subordination
sapos + Clause :  if
 if we find a pig, we'll kill it

Dialectal variations
Dialects exist, based mainly on different pronunciations in different areas which stem from the different sounds of the native languages. The future tense marker can be heard to be said as: Bambae, Mbae, Nambae, or Bae. There are also preferences for using Bislama or native words that vary from place to place, and most people insert English, French, or local language words to fill out Bislama. So in the capital city it is common to hear 'computer'; in other places one might hear 'ordinateur'.

Pacific creole comparison

Literature and samples
The longest written work in Bislama is the Bible completed in 1998.

Yumi, Yumi, Yumi

Further reading
 Camden, William. 1979. Parallels in structure and lexicon and syntax between New Hebrides Bislama and the South Santo language spoken at Tangoa. In Papers in Pidgin and Creole Linguistics, No.2. Pacific Linguistics, A-57. Canberra: Australian National University. pp. 51–117.
 Charpentier, Jean-Michel. 1979. Le pidgin bislama(n) et le multilinguisme aux Nouvelles-Hébrides. Langues et Civilisations à Tradition Orale 35. Paris: SELAF.
 .

References

External links

 Bislama Wikipedia
 Bislama.org, a portal of resources about the Bislama language.
 Bislama Translator & Spelling Dictionary for Microsoft Word English – Bislama online translator and MS Word dictionary
 
Vanuatu Daily Post – news in English and Bislama
A bibliography of Bislama , from an Australian National University website
Peace Corps in Vanuatu – Bislama Language Lessons 
Portions of the Book of Common Prayer in Bislama Preabuk long Bislama
Book of Mormon in Bislama
Paradisec has a number of collections that include recordings of Bislama language.

English-based pidgins and creoles
Languages of Vanuatu
Languages of New Caledonia
Bislama words and phrases